Strangers is the third studio album by British singer-songwriter Ed Harcourt.

Track listing
 "The Storm Is Coming" – 4:51
 "Born in the '70s" – 3:15
 "This One's for You" – 4:49
 "Strangers" – 3:30
 "Let Love Not Weigh Me Down" – 4:19
 "Something to Live For" – 2:32
 "The Trapdoor" – 4:49
 "The Music Box" – 3:26
 "Loneliness" – 2:53
 "Open Book" – 4:39
 "Kids (Rise from the Ashes)" – 4:31
 "Black Dress" – 3:18

Bonus tracks
Japan release
 "Every Night" – 2:49
 "Epitaph" – 2:04

US release
 "Only Happy When You're High" – 4:22

Singles
In the UK, there were three singles released:
"This One's for You" (30 August 2004); CD, 7" vinyl
B-sides: "Mysteriously" / "Deathsexmarch"
"Born in the '70s" (1 November 2004); CD, DVD, 7" vinyl
B-sides: "Only Happy When You're High" / "Breathe a Little Softer" / "Born in the '70s" (video) / "This One's for You" (video)
"Loneliness" (14 February 2005); CD, 7" vinyl
B-sides: "Epitaph" / "Every Night"

Personnel
All songs written by Ed Harcourt, except where stated.

 "The Storm Is Coming" (Ed Harcourt, Leo Abrahams)
Andy Young – Drums
Jari Haapalainen – Bass, percussion
Ed Harcourt – Piano, acoustic guitar, lead and backing vocals
Leo Abrahams – Lead guitar
The Bear – Maracas
 "Born in the '70s"
Ed Harcourt – Acoustic guitar, bass, vocals, piano, clarinet
Jari Haapalainen – Drums, percussion, 12-string and 6-string acoustic guitar, bell
Hadrian Garrard – Backing vocals
 "This One's for You"
Hadrian Garrard – Trumpet
Ed Harcourt – Piano, vocals, bass, Wurlitzer organ, electric tremolo guitar
Jari Haapalainen – Drums, percussion, electric guitar
 "Strangers"
Jari Haapalainen – Drums, percussion, handclaps
Hadrian Garrard – Claps, triangle, handclaps
Gita Langley – Violins, backing vocals
Ed Harcourt – Wurlitzer organ, guitar, bass, handclaps, kazoo, lead vocals
 "Let Love Not Weigh Me Down"
Ed Harcourt – Piano, guitars, bass, vocals
Gita Langley – Violins
Jari Haapalainen – Drums, percussion
 "Something to Live For"
Hadrian Garrard – Chimes and bells
Ed Harcourt – Pump organ, vocals
 "The Trapdoor"
Ed Harcourt – Acoustic guitar, Wurlitzer organ, vocals
Hadrian Garrard – Chimes and bells, timpani, megaphone, trumpet
Jari Haapalainen – Lead guitar, feedback
 "The Music Box"
Hadrian Garrard – Trumpets
Jari Haapalinen – Drums, percussion
Ed Harcourt – Piano, guitar, bass, clarinet, organ, vocals
 "Loneliness"
Jari Haapalainen – Drums, 12 string electric guitar and 6 string acoustic guitar, percussion
Ellekari Larsson (The Tiny) – Vocals
Ed Harcourt – Vocals, piano, bass, Solina string machine
 "Open Book"
Ed Harcourt – Piano, Hammond organ, vocals, snare drum, Wurlitzer organ
Hadrian Garrard – Snare drum
Jari Haapalainen – Snare drum
 "Kids (Rise From the Ashes)"
Ed Harcourt – Piano, bass, Hammond organ, synthesiser, vocals
Jari Haapalainen – Drums, percussion
 "Black Dress"
Andy Young – Drums
Ed Harcourt – Bass, piano, guitar, Hammond organ, vocals
Hadrian Garrard – Trumpets
Jari Haapalainen – Bass drum, hi hat, claves, maracas

Personnel
 Leo Abrahams – lead guitar
 The Bear – maracas
 Hadrian Garrard – trumpet, bells, chimes, backing vocals, megaphone, snare drum, timpani, triangle, handclaps
 Jari Haapalainen – percussion, drums, 6-string acoustic guitar, 12-string acoustic guitar, electric guitar, 12-string electric guitar, lead guitar, bass, feedback, bass drum, snare drum, hi-bat, Bell, maracas, claves, handclaps
 Ed Harcourt – vocals, piano, bass, guitar, Wurlitzer organ, acoustic guitar, Hammond organ, lead vocals, Clavinet, backing vocals, electric tremolo guitar, organ, pump organ, synthesiser, Solina string machine, kazoo, snare drum, handclaps
 Gita Langley – violin, backing vocals
 Ellekari Larsson – vocals
 Andy Young – drums

2004 albums
Ed Harcourt albums
Heavenly Recordings albums